The 1973 Colorado Buffaloes football team represented the University of Colorado in the Big Eight Conference during the 1973 NCAA Division I football season. Led by eleventh-year head coach Eddie Crowder, the Buffaloes were 5–6 overall (2–5 in Big 8, tied for sixth), and played their home games on campus at Folsom Field in Boulder, Colorado.

After rallying to defeat #7 Missouri to improve to 5–2, CU dropped its final four games and incurred its first losing season in five years. Also the athletic director since 1965, Crowder stepped down as head coach in December; he was succeeded in January 1974 by Bill Mallory, the head coach at undefeated Miami University in Ohio.

Schedule

Roster

References

External links
University of Colorado Athletics – 1973 football roster
Sports Reference – 1973 Colorado football season

Colorado
Colorado Buffaloes football seasons
Colorado Buffaloes football